The Panzaleo are a group of Quichua people in Ecuador, primarily in Cotopaxi and Tungurahua provinces.

Panzaleo pottery was originally thought to be associated with this group, but has since been identified as a type of trade pottery.

References

External links
Codenpe.gov.ec
Edufuturo.com

Ethnic groups in Ecuador